Zorsines was a 1st-century King (rex Siracorum) of the Siraces mentioned in Tacitus' Annals of the Roman Empire (XII.15-19) around 50 AD, a people he reports as residing somewhere between the Caucasus mountains and the Don river.

He had a fortification at Uspe.

He fought in the Bosporus under Mithridates III, the former king of the Bosporan Kingdom, against the Dandaridae. His ally Mithridates later turned against and fought the Romans in 47 / 48 AD who had put him on the throne earlier in 41. Mithridates eluded the Romans and managed to recover his kingdom. The Aorsi under Prince Eunones, sent by Gaius Julius Aquila and Cotys was sent after Mithridates and his lands, later clashed with Zorsines, besieging Uspe in 49 AD (The town offered 10,000 slaves for their capitulation but the assault continued as the Romans declined). Zorsines finally decided to leave Mithridates to rule his paternal lands, after giving hostages to the Romans and thus making peace. He acknowledged Roman superiority before the image of Emperor Claudius.

See also
Serboi

References

External links
Who was Who in Roman Times: Zorsines

1st-century monarchs in Europe
Sarmatian rulers